Free Now may refer to:

Free Now (Paul McCartney song)
Free Now (Service)

Disambiguation pages